Selda Akgöz (born June 9, 1993) is a Turkish women's football goalkeeper, who plays in the Turkish Women's Football Super League for Ankara BB Fomget GS with jersey number 1. She is a member of the Turkey women's team.

Early years 
Selda Akgöz was born in Çaycuma town of Zonguldak Province on  	June 9, 1993. Already in school years, she began playing handball before she switched over to volleyball. In the end, she found herself in football through her teacher's suggestion. From the beginning on, she wanted to be a goalkeeper and got enthusiastic about diving save, which she still performs.

Club career 

Selda Akgöz obtained her license on March 5, 2009, for the Regional League team Ovacık Gençlik Spor in Karabük. After graduation from the high school and playing 26 matches in two seasons, she moved to Fomget Gençlik ve Spor in Ankara to play in the Women's First league and to begin with her university study in physical education and sports there. She became captain of the team,  and appeared at 37 matches in three seasons before she was transferred by Trabzon İdmanocağı in the 2014–15 season.

By August 2017, she transferred to the Izmir-based league-champion Konak Belediyespor, and took part at the 2017–18 UEFA Champions League as the reserve goalkeeper. In October of the same year, she left Konak Belediyespor to join Kdz. Ereğlispor in the 2017–18 season.

On June 1, 2018, Akgöz signed with the Istanbul-based club Ataşehir Belediyespor before the club's participation at the 2018–19 UEFA Women's Champions League qualifying round. She played in two of the three matches of the qualification round.

By August 2020, she transferred to the Gaziantep-based 2019-20 Women's League season top club ALG Spor.  She enjoyed the 2021-22 Women's Super League champion title of her team.

Akgöz transferred to her former club Ankara BB Fomget GS in October 2022.

International career 

Selda Akgöz was admitted to the Turkey girls' U-17 team for the 2010 UEFA Championship qualifying round – Group 4 matches. However, she played first time at the International Friendly Tournament in the match against Bulgaria on June 27, 2010. She capped 3 times for the U-17 nationals.

She was called up to the Turkey women's U-19 team for the 2011 UEFA Women's U-19 Championship First qualifying round – Group 9, at which she served as substitute only. She debuted in the 2011 Kuban Spring Tournament match against China on March 10. Finally, Akgöz participated at the 2012 UEFA Women's Under-19 Championship – Group A matches. She played 14 times in total for the Turkey women's U-19 team.

On November 26, 2014, Selda Akgöz played the goalkeeper of the Turkey women's U-21 team in the friendly game against Belgium.

Selda Akgöz debuted in the Turkey women's team in a friendly match against Georgia on February 26, 2015.

Career statistics 
.

Honours 
 Turkish Women's First League
 Trabzon İdmanocağı
 Third places (2): 2014–15, 2015–16

 ALG Spor
 Champions (1): 2021-22
 Third places (1): 2020-21

References

External links 

1993 births
Living people
People from Çaycuma
20th-century Turkish sportswomen
21st-century Turkish sportswomen
Turkish women's footballers
Women's association football goalkeepers
Turkey women's international footballers
Fomget Gençlik ve Spor players
Trabzon İdmanocağı women's players
Konak Belediyespor players
Karadeniz Ereğlispor players
Ataşehir Belediyespor players
Turkish Women's Football Super League players
ALG Spor players